Shaun Miller was born with a congenital heart defect and died on Saturday 26 May 2012 at the age of 17 years. Shaun was born on 23 January 1995. Before Shaun died, he lived with his father in the Melbourne suburb of Mill Park and went to school at Lalor North Secondary College up until Year 10.

Shaun was an Essendon Bombers football fan and met his idol, Jobe Watson, on Channel 9's The Footy Show. Since the age of 13, Shaun enjoyed being a HeartKids Victoria ambassador and a motivational speaker to many children.

Shaun's funeral was held at Plenty Ranges Arts and Community Centre. Nearly 1,000 people attended and there were many tributes from around the world. Shaun also posted his final goodbye on YouTube on May 1, 2012. Soon after uploading his "Final Goodbye", it had begun to receive large amounts of attention and grief from other viewers on the platform YouTube. As of 2020, the video has 7.4M+ views.

Book
Author Shaun Miller published, An Awesome Ride, on 2 December 2012. Shaun's dying wish was to publish his book which promotes being positive and never giving up on life. The book reveals how he met his first girlfriend, suffered domestic abuse and continued to be brave through his serious heart condition. Cameron Miller is promoting Shaun's strong message nationally through book signings, radio and TV interviews and school guest appearances.

An Awesome Ride launched on Sunday 2 December at Kingston Arts and Cultural Centre with guest performances from Rachael Leahcar, Fatai Veveamatahau and Paula Parore. The evening was hosted by comedian Bev Killick and more than 100 people attended the concert that followed the book launch.

In May 2013, An Awesome Ride, won an Independent Publishers Book Award for Best Regional Non-Fiction (Australia/New Zealand
.

In 2019 Penguin Random House published the autobiography of Shaun's father, Cameron, with content from the original book. The book is titled An Awesome Ride Through a Father's Eyes and was co-authored with Andrew Clarke.

Movie

Shaun's father, Cameron Miller, is currently in negotiations with movie studios about the production of the movie An Awesome Ride.

References

1995 births
Australian writers
2012 deaths
People from Victoria (Australia)